Thomas Webster  (10 March 180023 September 1886), was a British painter of genre  scenes of school and village life, many of which became popular through prints. He lived for many years at the artists' colony at Cranbrook in Kent.

Life

Webster was born in Ranelagh Street, Pimlico, London. His father was a member of the household of George III, and the son, having shown an aptitude for music, became a 
chorister, first at St George's Chapel in Windsor Castle, and then the Chapel Royal at St. James's Palace in London. He abandoned music for painting, however, 
and in 1821 was admitted as a student at the Royal Academy, exhibiting, in 1824, a portrait of "Mr Robinson and Family". In the following year he won first prize in the school of painting.

In 1825, also, Webster exhibited Rebels shooting a Prisoner,  at the Suffolk Street Gallery - the first of a series of pictures of schoolboy life for which he subsequently became known. In 1828 he exhibited The Gunpowder Plot at the Royal Academy, and in 1829 The Prisoner and A Foraging Party Aroused at the British Institution.  These were followed by numerous other pictures of school and village 
life at both galleries. In 1840 Webster was elected an associate of the Royal Academy (ARA), and in 1846 a Royal Academician (RA). He continued to be a frequent exhibitor there until 1876, when he retired from 
the academy. He exhibited a  self-portrait in 1878, and Released from School, his last picture, in 1879.

In 1856 Webster was photographed at the Photographic Institute in London by Robert Howlett, as part of a series of portraits of artists. The picture was among a group exhibited at the Art Treasures Exhibition in Manchester in 1857.

From 1835 to 1856 Webster lived at The Mall, Kensington, but the last thirty years of his life were spent at the artists' colony in Cranbrook, Kent, where he died on 23 Sept. 1886.

Work

Webster became known for his genre paintings, often with children as subjects, depicting incidents from everyday life in a genial and humorous way. Many of these were exceedingly popular, particularly his 
Punch (1840) with which he procured associate membership of the Royal Academy.

In the limited range of subjects which he made his own, Webster was unrivalled. Some of his pictures - such as Please remember the Grotto,  Snowballing and maybe The Swing -  were issued as prints by 
Abraham Le Blond. The Smile (1841), The Frown and The Boy with Many Friends, are among the numerous pictures which became well known by engravings.  He also contributed work to volumes issued by the London-based Etching Club: The Deserted Village (1841), Songs of Shakespeare (1843), and Etch'd Thoughts (1844).

Webster was influential on the work of fellow Cranbrook artists George Bernard O'Neill and Frederick Daniel Hardy.

Notes

ReferencesAttribution:'''

External links

 In Sickness and Health (1843), 
The artist's father and mother (first exhibited at the Royal Academy in 1844), 
A Dame's School (1845) The Village Choir'' (1847).
Thomas Webster online (ArtCyclopedia)
Thomas Webster biography and works (Royal Academy collection)
Thomas Webster biography and art (The Weald - people history and genealogy)
The Dunce (c. 1850 painting)

1800 births
1886 deaths
19th-century English painters
English male painters
British genre painters
Royal Academicians
People from Pimlico
Painters from London
19th-century English male artists